The 1991 KFK competitions in Ukraine were republican level competitions conducted by the Football Federation of the Ukrainian SSR. It was 27th season of the KFK in Ukraine since its introduction in 1964 and the last season of the Soviet football competitions. The format established before the season was preserved and the top three teams eventually qualified to the 1992 Ukrainian First League, the other top performers from each group qualified for the 1992 Ukrainian Transfer League.

Composition

The information on the competition is incomplete.

Group 1

Group 2

Group 3

Notes
 Temp Korsun-Shevchenkivskyi withdrew and its results were annulled.

Group 4

Group 5

Group 6

Final

Notes

External links
 Украинский квотер. 1991, первый чемпион. UA-Football. 21 April 2016
 Чемпионат УССР 1991. footballfacts.ru

Ukrainian Football Amateur League seasons
Amateur